Daniel Bélanger (born December 26, 1961) is a Canadian singer-songwriter. His music is eclectic, inspired by alternative rock, folk and electronic music, sometimes humorous, sometimes wistful.

Biography
In 1983, Bélanger founded the band Humphrey Salade with Norman Lachance, Eric Maier and Jean Gauvin. Unfortunately, timing was not right and the band never recorded.

His first solo album released in 1992, Les Insomniaques s'amusent has sold 175,000 copies and won the Félix for best pop-rock album. The first single released Opium was number one in Quebec for seven weeks and won the Félix for Videoclip of the Year.  This first album also earned him the ADISQ awards for Bestselling Album of the Year, Male Performer of the Year and Show of the Year in 1994.

In 1996, Quatre saisons dans le désordre was released. The album was a critical and popular success, winning the (Félix for the Pop-Rock Album, Singer-Songwriter and Show of the Year, in the singer-songwriter category). The album was certified Platinum and titles like Les deux printemps, Sortez-moi de moi and Les Temps fous (Félix for Videoclip of the Year) topped the charts.

1998: Daniel Bélanger toured as a solo artist honing his skills as a musical performer who enhanced his act with amusing stories and anecdotes; this led to the recording of an unusual album, Tricycle (1999), featuring excerpts from performances recorded at different points in his career.

2000: Daniel Bélanger released Erreur d’impression, a collection of 150 whimsical stories and reflections. He founded the publishing house Coronet liv. He continued to take part in major shows, including the opening concert of the 12th FrancoFolies de Montréal.

In October 2001, Bélanger released Rêver mieux. The album was an immediate success, winning (seven ADISQ awards in 2002, including Pop-Rock Album of the Year, and the following year, the ADISQ award for Videoclip of the Year for Dans un Spoutnik, the Juno Award for Francophone Album of the Year and was certified platinum.

Bélanger has also made achieved critical acclaim for the music he has written for films.  he was nominated for a Genie Award for Best Original Song for the movie theme Le Dernier souffle in 2000; Jutra for Best Music for L’Audition in 2006).

L'Échec du matériel, released in April 2007, is an album just as poetic and melodious as Rêver mieux, but more rooted in the concerns and aspirations of his contemporaries.

Belanger won the 2008 Juno Award for Francophone Album of the Year for L'Échec du matériel. In November 2009, he released his album Nous and, once again, won the Félix for the Pop-Rock Album in 2010.

In 2010 he wrote the music for the French musical Les Belles-Soeurs and its 2014 English adaptation, Belles Soeurs: The musical.

In 2018 his album Paloma was named Francophone album of the year at the Juno Awards.

In 2020 he appeared as a guest vocalist on "Signal", a track on electronic musician CRi's album Juvenile. In the same year he released Travelling, an album of instrumental music inspired by film soundtracks. This release gave him the prize of best instrumental album of the year at the ADISQ Gala

His 2022 album Mercure en mai was a Juno nominee for Francophone Album of the Year at the Juno Awards of 2023.

Discography

Videography

 Ensorcelée (1992)
 Les temps fous (1992)
 Le parapluie (1996)
 Chante encore (2002)
 Spoutnik (2002)
 Reste (2009)

References

1961 births
Singers from Montreal
Canadian singer-songwriters
Canadian pop singers
French-language singers of Canada
Juno Award for Francophone Album of the Year winners
Living people
Audiogram (label) artists
20th-century Canadian male singers
21st-century Canadian male singers
Félix Award winners
Canadian male singer-songwriters